Carl Wafer (born  January 17, 1951) is a former defensive end in the National Football League (NFL). He played professionally for the New York Giants and the Green Bay Packers.

Early life
Wafer was born in Magnolia, Arkansas. He played college football at Tennessee State University.

Professional career
Wafer was drafted in the second round of the 1974 NFL Draft by the Denver Broncos. He split that season playing between the New York Giants and the Green Bay Packers. Wafer played one season in the NFL.

References

External links
 
 databaseFootbal.com: Carl Wafer
 NFL Enterprises LLC: Carl Wafer
 Pro-Football-Reference.com: Carl Wafer

People from Magnolia, Arkansas
New York Giants players
Green Bay Packers players
American football defensive ends
Tennessee State Tigers football players
1951 births
Living people